Sallie Bingham (born January 22, 1937) is an American author, playwright, poet, teacher, feminist activist, and philanthropist. She is the eldest daughter of Barry Bingham, Sr., patriarch of the Bingham family of Louisville, Kentucky.

Sallie Bingham's first novel was published by Houghton Mifflin in 1961. It was followed by four collections of short stories; her latest, published by Sarabande Books in October 2011, is titled Mending: New and Selected Stories. She has also published six additional novels, three collections of poetry, numerous plays (produced off-Broadway and regionally), and a family memoir, Passion and Prejudice (Knopf, 1989).

Her short stories have appeared in The Atlantic Monthly, New Letters, Plainswoman, Plainsong, Greensboro Review, Negative Capability, The Connecticut Review, and Southwest Review, among others, and have been anthologized in Best American Short Stories, Forty Best Stories from Mademoiselle, Prize Stories: The O. Henry Awards, and The Harvard Advocate Centennial Anthology. She has received fellowships from Yaddo, the MacDowell Colony, and the Virginia Center for the Creative Arts.

Bingham has worked as a book editor for The Courier-Journal in Louisville and has been a director of the National Book Critics Circle. She is founder of the Kentucky Foundation for Women, which published The American Voice, and the Sallie Bingham Center for Women's History and Culture at Duke University.

Born and raised in Louisville, Kentucky, Bingham has been married three times: to publisher A. Whitney Ellsworth, attorney Michael Iovenko, and contractor Tim Peters. She has three sons—film producer Barry Ellsworth, William Iovenko, and writer Christopher Iovenko—and five grandchildren. She currently resides in Santa Fe, New Mexico.

Bibliography
Memoir
Passion and Prejudice (Knopf, 1989)
The Blue Box: Three Lives in Letters (Sarabande Books, 2014)

Short stories
The Touching Hand (Houghton Mifflin, 1967)
The Way It Is Now (Viking Press, 1972)
Transgressions (Sarabande Books, 2002)
Red Car (Sarabande Books, 2008)
Mending: New and Selected Stories (Sarabande Books, 2011)

Novels
After Such Knowledge (Houghton Mifflin, 1960)
Small Victories (Zoland Books, 1992)
Upstate (Permanent Press, 1993)
Matron of Honor (Zoland Books, 1994)
Straight Man (Zoland Books, 1996)
Cory's Feast (Sunstone Press, 2005)
Nick of Time (Sunstone Press, 2007)

Poetry
The High Cost of Denying Rivers Their Floodplain (privately published, 1995)
The Hub of the Miracle (Sunstone Press, 2006)
If in Darkness (Tebot Bach, 2010)

Plays
Milk of Paradise, two children adrift in a confusing world of distracted adults and too much poetry (The Women's Project and Productions, NY, 1980)
Couvade, a one-man show in which the actor gives birth on stage (Actors Theatre, Louisville, KY, 1981)
Paducah, a comedy about a love triangle in a small Kentucky town, in which the two women become best friends (The Women's Project and Productions, NY, 1983)
In the Presence, based on The Wall Between by renowned civil rights worker Anne McCarty Braden (Goucher College, Baltimore, MD, 1984; Mill Mountain Theatre, Roanoke, VA, 1986)
Hopscotch, the history of four well-known Kentucky women, including the truths that are often left out (Horse Cave Theater, KY, 1986)
The Awakening, an adaptation of the novel by Kate Chopin (Horse Cave Theater, KY, 1988)
Treason, about how Ezra Pound betrayed the three women who loved him while on trial for betraying his country (Perry Street Theatre, NY, 2006)
A Dangerous Personality, about the renowned mystic and founder of Theosophy, Helena Petrovna Blavatsky (The Women's Project, NY, 2008)

Anthologies
Best American Short Stories: 1959, eds. Martha Foley and David Burnett (Houghton Mifflin, 1959)
40 Best Stories from Mademoiselle, 1935–1960, eds. Cyrilly Abels and Margarita G. Smith (Gollancz, 1960)
The Harvard Advocate Centennial Anthology, ed. Jonathan D. Culler (Shenkman Books, 1966)
Identity: Stories for this Generation, ed. Katherine Hondius (Scott, Foresman and Co., 1966)
Prize Stories 1966: The O. Henry Awards, eds. Richard Poirier and William Miller Abrahams (Doubleday, 1966)
Solo: Women on Woman Alone, eds. Linda Hamalian and Leo Hamalian (Delacorte Press, 1977)
Here's the Story: Fiction with Heart, ed. Morty Sklar (The Spirit That Moves Us Press, 1985)
American Wives: 30 Short Stories by Women, ed. Barbara Solomon (Signet, 1987)
New Stories by Southern Women, ed. Mary Ellis Gibson (University of South Carolina Press, 1989)
Playwriting Women: 7 Plays from the Women's Project and Productions, ed. Julia Miles (Heinemann Drama, 1993)
Home and Beyond: An Anthology of Kentucky Short Stories, ed. Morris A. Grubbs (The University Press of Kentucky, 2001)
I to I, Life Writing by Kentucky Feminists, eds. Elizabeth Oakes and Jane Olmsted (Western Kentucky University, 2004)
The Kentucky Anthology: Two Hundred Years of Writing in the Bluegrass State, ed. Wade Hall (University Press of Kentucky, 2005)
Imagine What It's Like, A Literature and Medicine Anthology, ed. Ruth L. Nadelhaft (University of Hawaii Press, 2008)
World Premieres from Horse Cave: Plays by Kentucky Writers, eds.  Liz Bussey Fentress and Warren Hammack (MotesBooks, 2009)

Nonfiction

 The Silver Swan: In Search of Doris Duke (Farrar, Straus and Giroux, 2020)

References

External links
Sallie Bingham official web site
Sallie Bingham Center for Women's History and Culture, Duke University
The Kentucky Foundation for Women
New York Society Library Tribute
Amazon.com's Sallie Bingham page

1937 births
20th-century American dramatists and playwrights
20th-century American memoirists
American women memoirists
American feminist writers
Sallie
Writers from Louisville, Kentucky
Living people
American women dramatists and playwrights
Radcliffe College alumni
20th-century American women writers
Courier Journal people
Kentucky women writers
Activists from Kentucky
Kentucky women philanthropists
Louisville Collegiate School alumni
21st-century American women